Richard de Morcester was an Archdeacon in the Diocese of Exeter from 1315
to 1318.

He was Archdeacon of Barnstaple from 1315 to 1318 and Archdeacon of Exeter in 1318.

References

Archdeacons of Barnstaple